Mark Bryan Hope (born 13 June 1970) is an English former footballer who played in the Football League as a centre back for Darlington.

Hope joined Third Division Darlington from non-league club Porthleven in January 1997, and made his debut on 11 January away to top-of-the-table Fulham. Playing as the middle of three centre-backs, he was substituted after 65 minutes with Darlington having conceded twice in three minutes to go 3–0 down, and never played league football again.

References

1970 births
Living people
Footballers from Isleworth
English footballers
Association football defenders
Porthleven F.C. players
Darlington F.C. players
English Football League players